Sphenodesme thorelii is the accepted name of a species of small liana in the genus Sphenodesme (family Lamiaceae).  
This species is named after the French botanist Clovis Thorel and found in southern Vietnam, where it may be called bội tinh Thorel.

References

External links

 IPNI Id: 864673-1
 WCSP record: 194081

Lamiaceae
Flora of Vietnam